Carly Rose Sonenclar (born April 20, 1999), who performs under the name Carly Rose, is an American singer, songwriter and actress. In December 2012, she became the runner-up on the second season of The X Factor.

Early and personal life
Sonenclar was born in Westchester, New York and currently resides in Los Angeles, California. She began singing at age two, imitating several of the performers on the early years of American Idol. She took numerous singing, dancing, piano and acting classes, and one of her teachers put her in touch with a New York City talent agency, which signed her. She enjoys softball and has an older brother, Russell, who graduated from the University of Delaware. She takes piano lessons and enjoys composing songs.

She graduated from Rye Neck High School in 2017. In the spring of 2021, she graduated from the University of Southern California.

Sonenclar is Jewish.

Acting career
Sonenclar began her professional career in 2006 in a stage adaptation of The Night of the Hunter, at the New York Musical Theatre Festival, in which she played the lead role of Pearl. In that same year, she made her Broadway debut in Les Miserables as Young Cosette. In 2009, she appeared in the national tour of Little House on the Prairie, the Musical, starring Melissa Gilbert, originating the principal role of Carrie. Sonenclar made her television debut as Gilda Flip on PBS, the newest Prankster in season three of The Electric Company, produced by Sesame Workshop.

In 2011, Sonenclar originated the role of Chloe (Alice's daughter) in the short-lived musical Wonderland on Broadway and the earlier Tampa workshop. In this role, she garnered good reviews, including one by The New York Times theater critic Charles Isherwood, who described Sonenclar as a good actress and an "almost preternaturally skilled singer" and she drew comparisons with Sutton Foster. She is a featured soloist on the cast CD produced by Sony Masterworks and was named the 2011 Best Young Performer by broadwayworld.com. Sonenclar originated the lead role of Parsley in The Big Bank, a musical debuted at the New York Musical Theater Festival in October 2011.

Sonenclar has appeared in two feature movies, The Nanny Diaries playing as the "child of nanny" and a small role in The Sisterhood of the Traveling Pants 2.  She has made numerous TV guest appearances.

Singing career

2012: The X Factor
In 2012, Sonenclar auditioned for the second season of The X Factor USA with the song "Feeling Good" by Anthony Newley and Leslie Bricusse (famously covered by Nina Simone among others). Sonenclar received a standing ovation from all four judges (L.A. Reid commented "You may be 13, but your soul is old!"; Simon Cowell awarded her "4,833 yeses"), and she advanced to the next round. After her successful initial audition, she advanced through the first day of X Factor'''s "bootcamp," where she sang "Pumped Up Kicks" with Beatrice Miller. Of the 120 contestants who auditioned at bootcamp that day, she was among the sixty or so asked to continue on. At the end of bootcamp, she was chosen to be one of the six contestants in the "teens" category who were invited to perform at the "judges' houses" stage of the competition. She performed the song "Brokenhearted" for the "teens" category mentor, Britney Spears, and Spears' guest judge will.i.am. Both Spears and will.i.am responded positively to her performance; will.i.am remarked appreciatively that she was "possessed." Sonenclar next advanced into the Top 16 round, where she performed "Good Feeling", then the Top 13 round, where she performed "It Will Rain". When Sonenclar reached the Top 12 round—where she performed "My Heart Will Go On"—it was revealed that she was the second-most-voted for person in the competition so far, behind only Tate Stevens, a distinction she achieved again after advancing to the Top 10 round.

On November 21, she performed the song "Over the Rainbow", which she received a standing ovation from all four judges, sending her into the Top 8 round. It was revealed that she had been the #1 most-voted-for contestant in the competition that night. On November 28, she performed "Rolling in the Deep", sending her into the Top 6 round, and was revealed to have again been the #1 most-voted-for contestant in the competition. She later advanced to the Finale round, in which she performed "Feeling Good" (again), "How Do I Live" (with LeAnn Rimes), and "Hallelujah". On December 20, 2012, it was announced that she had finished the competition in second place behind Tate Stevens.

Performances on The X Factor

Sonenclar performed the following songs on The X Factor:

2013–present: Unreleased music and independent releases
Sonenclar stated in 2013 that Syco Music has a recording option on her, and that they were "trying to find the right record label" for her. In June 2013, she performed her debut original song "Unforgettable", as well as another song called "Fighters". The following month, she performed at the opening ceremony of the 19th Maccabiah Games at Teddy Stadium in Jerusalem. In August 2013, she performed in New York City at the Best Buy Theater in Times Square as part of the Stand Up for a Cure 2013 Concert Series.

Sonenclar appeared in an episode of Law & Order: Special Victims Unit, "Dissonant Voices", which aired in November 2013, during the show's fifteenth season. Sonenclar has performed on several occasions with Boyce Avenue. In 2014, she continued to attend public school"Carly Rose Sonenclar Interview: Talks Album, Charity Work, And Her Musical Love For Sam Smith", Empty Lighthouse magazine, November 23, 2014 and released an original music video, "Everybody's Watching". She gave a concert at Provident Bank Park in Pomona, New York, in July 2014, where she performed three original songs, “Aliens”, “Weekend” and “Everybody’s Watching”. On May 29, 2014, Sonenclar was ranked fifth by Fox Weekly'' on their list of Most Influential X Factor USA Contestants for her audition performance of "Feeling Good".

On June 19, 2019, Sonenclar released her debut single, "Birds & Bees". Since then, she has released numerous singles and a 7 songs EP, "Wild". She collaborated with singer Goody Grace for her first ever music video 'Wild'. She has also recorded a cover of Karmin's Brokenhearted which she had performed earlier at the Judges' houses at the X-Factor.

Discography

Extended plays

Singles

Other appearances

References

External links
 
 
 

1999 births
Living people
21st-century American actresses
21st-century American singers
Actresses from New York (state)
American child actresses
American child singers
American film actresses
American musical theatre actresses
American television actresses
Jewish American actresses
Jewish singers
People from Mamaroneck, New York
Singers from New York (state)
The X Factor (American TV series) contestants
21st-century American women singers
21st-century American Jews